Babe's & Ricky's Inn is a documentary film directed by Ramin Niami about the famed blues club, Babe's & Rickey's Inn. The film premiered April 5, 2013 at Laemmle Monica in Santa Monica, California.

Synopsis

The film chronicles the last days of one of the most unusual and vibrant blues clubs in the world, 
Babe's and Ricky's Inn, located surprisingly to some, in South Central, Los Angeles. For 53 years a woman from Mississippi, Laura Mae Gross (aka "Mama Laura") brought musicians together, regardless of race, age, or gender, in a place where only the music mattered. The club was originally located on legendary Central Ave, in South Central LA. -- a club where everyone was welcome, and great live blues could be heard every night. Musicians you'd recognize (like John Lee Hooker, B.B. King, Albert King, Eric Clapton, Keb' Mo', Zac Harmon) used to drop in to the club and jam with musicians you should know and the film features original music by some of the most important blues artists alive. Stunning guitar performances and personal stories about the hard blues life come together in a film about what it means to devote your life to music.

References

External links
 

2013 films
2013 documentary films
American documentary films
Documentary films about blues music and musicians
Documentary films about Los Angeles
Films directed by Ramin Niami
Music of Los Angeles
2010s English-language films
2010s American films